"Kiss and Not Tell" is a song by English singer Elly Jackson, known professionally as La Roux, from her second studio album, Trouble in Paradise (2014). It was written and produced by Jackson and Ian Sherwin, with additional writing from Ben Langmaid and Darren Berry. The song was released as the album's second and final single on 20 October 2014. La Roux performed the track on Live with Kelly and Michael on 10 July 2014 as well as throughout the Trouble in Paradise tour. "Kiss and Not Tell" was La Roux's first single to fail to enter the UK Singles Chart, instead reaching number 53 on the UK Physical Singles Chart.

Background
Elly Jackson has revealed that the song's lyrics are about a "feeling of when you're in a relationship and you both know the problems you might come up against maybe five years or 10 years into the relationship, but you choose to ignore them. [...] It's about all those secrets that you have that you both know about".

Jackson premiered "Kiss and Not Tell" at a concert in Brighton on 28 March 2013, along with three other songs that would eventually make it onto Trouble in Paradise: "Uptight Downtown", "Sexotheque" and "Tropical Chancer". She announced "Kiss and Not Tell" as the next single on her Instagram page on 2 September 2014, simultaneously revealing the cover art. The single was released on 20 October exclusively as a seven-inch vinyl single with "Tropical Chancer" as its B-side. A remix of the song was uploaded onto YouTube on 17 November, however, without crediting a specific author or stating the name of the remix.

Critical reception
The song was met with positive reviews from music critics. Heather Phares picked it as one of the standout tracks in her AllMusic review. Billboards Jason Lipshutz called the song an "effervescent treat".

Music video
The music video for "Kiss and Not Tell" was directed by Alexander Brown and premiered on 7 September 2014. Designed as a 1980s TV advert for phone sex hotline, it pictures Jackson as a recipient for the calls. Upon dialing, the phone number advertised in the video directed to the pre-recorded voice message from Jackson: "You're through to the 'Kiss and Not Tell' hotline. Press 1 to get down. Press 2 to leave a cheeky message. Be careful what you say – these recordings can and will be shared". The hotline was also advertised on promotional stickers distributed in London's Soho area in autumn 2014.

Track listing
7-inch single
A. "Kiss and Not Tell" – 3:51
B. "Tropical Chancer" – 3:29

Personnel
Credits adapted from the liner notes of Trouble in Paradise.

 Ian Sherwin – production, engineering, bass guitar, drum programming, mixing
 Elly Jackson – production, vocals, guitar, synth bass, keyboards, percussion, mixing
 Ben Langmaid – engineering
 Darren Berry – drum machine
 Chilly Gonzales – piano, Hammond organ
 Alan Moulder – mixing
 John Catlin – mixing assistance
 Caesar Edmunds – mixing assistance
 John Dent – mastering

Charts

Release history

References

Songs about kissing
2014 singles
2014 songs
La Roux songs
Polydor Records singles